Paul Edward Prentiss (September 9, 1908 – March 19, 1992) was an actor in the era of old-time radio. He was perhaps best known for portraying the title role on the radio version of Captain Midnight.

Early years
Prentiss was born in Chicago, Illinois. He attended the University of Iowa.

Radio
Radio historian Jim Harmon noted, in his book The Great Radio Heroes, "Ed Prentiss was not the first actor to play Captain Midnight, contrary to some published reports." After Bill Bouchey had the role in the program's second season, Prentiss auditioned for the third season, got the part, and continued as Captain Midnight for seven years.

On The Guiding Light soap opera, Prentiss played Ned (a "neglected youth") and was the program's "omniscient host." Beginning in 1943, Prentiss was narrator for an hour-long block consisting of three soap operas: Today's Children, The Guiding Light and Woman in White. The three programs had interconnecting story lines, with Prentiss's narration "introducing each program segment and linking all three together."

Prentiss's other roles on radio programs included those shown in the table below.

Prentiss had his own syndicated program, This Is The Story. An ad for the 15-minute program described it as follows: "Ed Prentiss, America's greatest story teller ... offers true and unusual tales, each with a surprisingly different ending."

He also was a regular on Arnold Grimm's Daughter, Painted Dreams, Bud Barton, The Romance of Helen Trent, Springtime and Harvest and Holland Housewarming.

Film
Prentiss appeared in Westbound (1959)  and The FBI Story (1959).

Television
Prentiss played Dr. Snyder on As the World Turns. He was one of the hosts of Action Autographs, was the host for Majority Rules. and played Edward Elliott on Morning Star. He also was the announcer for That's O'Toole.
He also played roles in various TV Westerns of the late 1950s-early '60s, often as a sheriff.  He is easily recognized by his voice, as well as his physical appearance. In 1957 Prentiss appeared as Bob Gentry on the TV western Cheyenne in the episode titled "Top Hand."

Personal life
Prentiss married Ivah Davidson on November 21, 1941. They had a son, born September 14, 1943.

Filmography

Notes

Perry Mason, Series 7, Episode 12. "The case of the badgered brother".
Credited as Voice on recording, at the reading of the will in Perry's office.

References

External links

1908 births
1992 deaths
American male film actors
American male radio actors
Place of death missing
American male television actors
Male actors from Chicago
20th-century American male actors